Rosser Beynon (1811 – 3 January 1876) was a Welsh musician. He was born in the Vale of Neath, Glamorganshire, shortly before his family moved to Merthyr Tydfil where for a few years he attended George Williams' school. At eight years of age, he left school and began work in a local iron-works. From a young age he attended the Soar Congregational Chapel, where he became a precentor in 1835 and ran a music class. He collected and wrote hymn tunes, twenty of these were published in Telyn Seion, a collection of hymn tunes and anthems. He died in January 1876 and was buried in Cefn cemetery, Merthyr Tydfil.

References

1811 births
1876 deaths
Welsh religious leaders
Welsh Methodist hymnwriters
19th-century Welsh musicians
19th-century Welsh writers
People from Glamorgan